Halli Meshtru is a 1992 Kannada-language romantic comedy film directed by Mohan-Manju. The film starred Ravichandran, Bindiya and Tara in key roles with Balakrishna, Thoogudeepa Srinivas and Silk Smitha playing supporting roles. The film is a remake of 1983 Tamil film Mundhanai Mudichu. The music of the film was composed by Hamsalekha.

Cast 
 Ravichandran as Meshtru
 Bindiya as Parimala
 Tara as first wife of Meshtru
 Balakrishna as Panditre
 Thoogudeepa Srinivas as chairman, Parimala Father
 Silk Smitha
 Girija Lokesh as Parimala Mother
 Gayatri Prabhakar
 Rathnakar
 Ajay raj

Soundtrack 
The film's soundtrack was composed by Hamsalekha with lyrics penned by Hamsalekha

References

External links 
 

1992 films
1990s Kannada-language films
Films scored by Hamsalekha
Kannada remakes of Tamil films
Films about educators
Films set in schools
Indian romantic comedy-drama films
Indian sex comedy films